Luís Carlos Correia Pinto (born 5 May 1985), known as Luisinho, is a Portuguese former professional footballer who played as a left-back.

Club career

Early years
Born in Porto, Luisinho made his senior debut with S.C. Vila Real in 2004. In the summer of 2005 he joined S.C. Braga, being assigned to the reserves and subsequently serving loans at Moreirense FC and Rio Ave FC.

In January 2008, Luisinho joined Moreirense on a permanent basis, moving to C.D. Aves in the Segunda Liga after one and a half seasons. He played his first competitive match for the latter on 2 August of that year, starting and being booked in a 1–1 home draw against G.D. Estoril Praia in the first round of the Taça da Liga.

Luisinho signed with F.C. Paços de Ferreira in June 2011. He appeared in 32 competitive matches in his only season at the Estádio da Mata Real, being also reconverted in a left-back in the process.

Benfica and Deportivo
On 31 May 2012, Luisinho joined S.L. Benfica along with teammate Michel. On 13 August of the following year, after being sparingly used, he moved abroad for the first time in his career, signing for Deportivo de La Coruña.

Luisinho slapped teammate Juan Carlos Real in the face on 2 April 2014, after both argued during a training session. He contributed 31 games and three goals during the season, as the club returned to La Liga after a one-year absence.

Luisinho continued to be a starter in 2014–15, under new manager Víctor Fernández, and in early December 2014 renewed his contract until 30 June 2018. However, the following campaign, he was involved in several spats with the latter's successor Víctor Sánchez.

Luisinho scored his first goal in the Spanish top division on 20 September 2017, in a 1–0 home win against Deportivo Alavés. He was first-choice during the season, which ended in relegation.

Huesca
After five years at Deportivo, Lusinho signed a two-year contract with newly-promoted SD Huesca on 15 June 2018. On 9 August 2020, after helping his side return to the top tier at the first attempt, the 35-year-old agreed to a one-year extension.

Leixões
On 3 July 2021, after Huesca's relegation, Luisinho returned to Portugal after eight years and signed for Leixões S.C. in the second division.

Honours
Huesca
Segunda División: 2019–20

References

External links

1985 births
Living people
Portuguese footballers
Footballers from Porto
Association football defenders
Primeira Liga players
Liga Portugal 2 players
Segunda Divisão players
S.C. Braga B players
Moreirense F.C. players
Rio Ave F.C. players
C.D. Aves players
F.C. Paços de Ferreira players
S.L. Benfica footballers
Leixões S.C. players
La Liga players
Segunda División players
Deportivo de La Coruña players
SD Huesca footballers
Portuguese expatriate footballers
Expatriate footballers in Spain
Portuguese expatriate sportspeople in Spain
Portuguese football managers